Hassana Alidou (born March 29, 1963) was Niger's ambassador to the United States and Canada from 2015 until 2019.  She then became the first scholar in residence for the Union Institute and University Institute for Social Justice.

Her twin sister Ousseina Alidou is an Africanist scholar specialising in the study of Muslim women in Africa, and a professor in the Department of African American and African Studies at Rutgers University.

Biography
Alidou graduated from the Université de Niamey in 1987 with a B.S. in linguistics. Unable to pursue graduate trainings in Niger, she received a Thomas Jefferson Fellowship which she used to the University of Illinois. After she earned a master's degree in linguistics in 1991. After teaching at Illinois, she returned to Niger in 1993 and was a lecturer the Université de Niamey.

References

1963 births
Ambassadors of Niger to the United States
Living people
Place of birth missing (living people)
Nigerien women ambassadors
Abdou Moumouni University alumni
University of Illinois alumni
Academic staff of Abdou Moumouni University
Ambassadors of Niger to Canada